The following is a list of Saint Louis University People, specifically notable alumni, notable faculty, and presidents of Saint Louis University.

Notable alumni

Academia
 Robert Arp (Ph.D. 2004) – philosopher and author
 George Hardin Brown – medieval literature
 Jesse Grant Chapline – American educator and politician who founded distance learning college
 Michael J. Garanzini S.J. (B.A. 1971) – President of Loyola University Chicago from 2001 to 2015; president of SLU student government association from 1969 to 1970.
 Gary Gutting, American philosopher
 Patrick A. Heelan, S.J. (Ph.D. 1952) - philosopher of science
 Robert J. Henle, S.J. (B.A., M.A., PhL, STL) President of Georgetown University from 1969 to 1976
 Joseph Koterski, S.J (M.A. 1980, Ph.D. 1982) – professor of philosophy and master of Queen's Court Residential College at Fordham University
 Francis Leo Lawrence (B.A. 1959) – President of Rutgers University from 1990 to 2002.
 William P. Leahy, S.J. (M.A. 1972, 1975) – President of Boston College since 1996.
 J. Bernard Machen (D.D.S. 1968) – President of the University of Florida from 2004 to 2014.
 Diana Natalicio – President of the University of Texas at El Paso
 Walter J. Ong, S.J. (M.A. 1941) – Cultural and religious historian, philosopher, and lecturer.
 Bernadette Gray-Little (Ph.D.) – Chancellor of the University of Kansas from 2009 to 2017.
 Joseph L. Badaracco – John Shad Professor of Business Ethics at Harvard Business School

Arts
 Thomas P. Barnett (1886) – Prominent architect and American impressionist painter.
 Charles Bosseron Chambers (1882-1964) – painter, and illustrator.
 Richard Dooling (B.A. 1976; J.D. 1987) – Lawyer and author of four novels: Critical Care; White Man's Grave; Brain Storm; Bet Your Life.
 Robert Guillaume (Attended) – Stage and television actor (Benson, Soap).
 James Gunn (B.A. 1992) – Film director ("Guardians of the Galaxy")(Slither), screenwriter (Dawn of the Dead, Scooby-Doo, Scooby-Doo 2: Monsters Unleashed), and novelist (The Toy Collector).
 Andreas Katsulas (B.A.) – Actor, (The Fugitive, Babylon 5, Star Trek: The Next Generation).
 David Merrick (J.D. 1937) – Broadway producer.
 Dennis O'Neil (1939-2020) – Writer, Editor: Batman (comic book); Green Lantern/Green Arrow; The Question; Daredevil; Beware the Creeper.

Business
 Richard Chaifetz (B.S. 1975) – Founder, chairman, CEO of ComPsych Corporation ; Founder, Chairman of Chaifetz Group ; Naming donor of the Richard A. Chaifetz School of Business and Chaifetz Arena
 Michael Bidwill (B.S. 1987) – President, Arizona Cardinals.
 August Busch IV (B.S.; M.B.A.) – Former President and CEO of the Anheuser-Busch Companies, Inc.
 Timothy J. Danis (B.S. 1969) - chairman and chief executive officer at Risk Consulting Partners.
Jim Kavanaugh (B.S.) – C.E.O. and co-founder of World Wide Technology
 Mark Lamping (M.B.A.) – Former President of the St. Louis Cardinals.
 Walden O'Dell (B.S.; M.S.) – CEO and Chairman of Diebold, Inc. (1999-2005).
 Rex Sinquefield (B.A.) – Co-founder and co-chairman of Dimensional Fund Advisors; president of the Show-Me Institute.

Politics

 Joyce Aboussie – Political strategist and National Political Director to Congressman Dick Gephardt
 Jorge Arosema (B.A. M.A.) – former Minister of Education of Panama and president of the City of Knowledge foundation.
 David Barrett (M.S.W. 1956) – Premier of British Columbia, Canada (1972-1975)
 Dana J. Boente (1954– ), General Counsel of the FBI and former Acting Attorney General of the United States
 Enrique Bolaños (B.A. 1962) – former President of Nicaragua
 Freeman Bosley Jr. (B.A. 1976; J.D. 1979) – St. Louis, Missouri's first African-American mayor
 Jack W. Buechner (J.D. 1965) – U.S. Congressman, Missouri (1987-1991)
 Quico Canseco (B.A., J.D.) – U.S. Congressman, Texas (2011-2013)
 Alfonso J. Cervantes – Forty-third mayor of the City of St. Louis (1965-1973)
 Bill Clay (B.S. 1953) – U.S. Congressman, Missouri (1969-2001)
 James F. Conway (B.S., M.B.A.) – Forty-fifth mayor of the City of St. Louis (1977-1981)
 Joseph M. Darst – Forty-first mayor of the City of St. Louis (1949-1953)
 Jason Grill – Representative in the Missouri House of Representatives, (2006-2010)
 William R. Haine – Member of the Illinois Senate
 Robert Emmett Hannegan (1903–1949) (J.D. 1925) – Commissioner of U.S. Internal Revenue (1943-1945); chairman, Democratic National Committee (1944-1947); U.S. Postmaster General (Truman administration, 1945–1947); President, St, Louis Cardinals (1947–1949)
 Lester C. Hunt – Governor of Wyoming (1943-1949), U.S. Senator, Wyoming (1949-1954)
      John M. Nations (J.D. 1988) – Mayor of Chesterfield, Missouri during 2001
 Kevin F. O'Malley (A.B. 1970, J.D. in 1973) – United States Ambassador to Ireland (2014-2017)
 Mark Parkinson – Republican member of the Missouri House of Representatives
Erika Polmar – businesswoman and activist
 William F. Quinn – First Governor of Hawaii (1959-1963)
 Richard J. Rabbitt (B.S. and L.l.b) – Speaker of Missouri House of Representatives
Dale A. Righter - member of the Illinois State House of Representatives 1997-2003, Illinois State Senate 2003-2021
 David Safavian (B.A.) – Chief of Staff, General Services Administration (2002-2003)
 Eric Schmitt (J.D. 2000) – Attorney General of Missouri, United States Senate, Missouri (2023-present)
 Francis Slay (J.D. 1980) – Forty-ninth mayor of the City of St. Louis
 Steve Stenger – Democratic politician and former County Executive of St. Louis County
 James F. Strother – Virginia House of Delegate (1840-1851), Speaker of the Virginia House (1851), U.S. Congressman, Virginia (1851-1853)
 John B. Sullivan – U.S. Congressman, Missouri (1941-1943, 1945–1947, 1949–1951)
 Joseph P. Teasdale (J.D.) – Governor of Missouri (1977-1981)
 Harold L. Volkmer – U.S. Congressman, Missouri (1977-1997)
 Stephen Webber – Democratic member of the Missouri House of Representatives
Charles A. Williams, Jr. - Rear Admiral USN, Presidential Appointment Assistant Secretary of the Navy, Governor Appointment Military Preparedness Commission

Science and medicine

 Joseph Dancis (M.D. 1938) – pediatrician known for his contributions to the fields of neonatology and placentology. 1988 recipient of the John Howland Award.
 Richard G. Thomas (B.S. 1952)  – (Aeronautical Engineering) Northrop test pilot – Tacit Blue; Secret Project/Area 51, F-5 Spin Tests, Edwards AFB, California.
 Thomas Anthony Dooley (M.D. 1953) – Humanitarian, physician, and CIA operative who worked in Southeastern Asia; author of Deliver Us from Evil, The Edge of Tomorrow, and The Night They Burned the Mountain.
 Gene Kranz (B.S. 1954) – Lead NASA flight director during the Apollo 11 moon landing and leader of the Apollo 13 rescue mission.
 Irene D. Long (M.D. 1977) – First female chief medical officer at Kennedy Space Center.
 Nathan H. Lents (B.S., 1999; Ph.D., 2004) – Scientist and Author.
 Jan Garavaglia, MD – Star of Dr. G.: Medical Examiner.

Sports

 Andy Benes – All-Star Major League Baseball right-handed pitcher.  Played 14 years in Major League Baseball, from 1989 to 2002, and with four different teams: the San Diego Padres, the Seattle Mariners, the St. Louis Cardinals and the Arizona Diamondbacks. Benes joined SLU as a student after his professional baseball career ended.
 Anthony Bonner – SLU's all-time leading scorer in men's basketball and played six seasons in the NBA for the Sacramento Kings, New York Knicks and the Orlando Magic.
 Dick Boushka – Basketball All-American in 1954–55, Olympic gold medalist in 1956. Drafted by the Minneapolis Lakers.
 Brad Davis – attended but never graduated, was drafted after his sophomore year into the MLS by the MetroStars, plays for Sporting Kansas City.
 Bob Ferry – Basketball All-American in 1958–59, enjoyed a ten-year career in the NBA with the St. Louis Hawks, Detroit Pistons, and Baltimore Bullets. Former assistant coach and general manager of the Baltimore Bullets; NBA Executive of the Year in 1979 and 1982.
 Larry Hughes – NBA basketball player, attended but never graduated, was drafted after his freshman year into the NBA by the Philadelphia 76ers.
 Ty Keough – Prominent amateur and professional soccer player and college coach; broadcaster with TNT, ESPN, and ABC
 Pat Leahy – Placekicker for the New York Jets from 1974 to 1990, played soccer at SLU
 Ed Macauley (1949) – NBA Hall of Famer
 Brian McBride – First American to score in more than one FIFA World Cup tournament, doing so once in 1998 and twice in 2002. He is also SLU's all-time leading goal-scorer and held the freshman scoring record until 2003, when he was surpassed by Vedad Ibišević.
 George Michael – Emmy-winning sportscaster, creator and host of The George Michael Sports Machine
 Tim Ream – Current defender for Fulham FC and United States men's national soccer team
 Marcus Relphorde (born 1988)  – basketball player in the Israeli National League
 Mike Shanahan – former owner of St. Louis Blues (1986-1995), soccer teams won national championships (1959, 1960)
 Jerry Trupiano – Former Boston Red Sox radio broadcaster
H Waldman (born 1972) – American-Israeli basketball player; Israeli Basketball Premier League

Miscellaneous
 Anton Anderledy  – twenty-third Superior General of the Society of Jesus.
 Michael G. Brandt – Air National Guard Brigadier General.
 Walter Halloran S.J.  – assisted in notable exorcism that inspired The Exorcist (novel).
 Jeremiah James Harty Archbishop of Manila and Omaha.
 John Kaiser – M.H.M. Mill Hill Missionary died under suspicious circumstances while serving in Kenya. Received an Award for Distinguished Service in the Promotion of Human Rights from the Law Society of Kenya prior to his death.
 Leo-Raymond de Neckere  – Bishop of New Orleans (1830-1833).
 John T. Richardson – 9th President of DePaul University
 Bradbury Robinson – Threw the first legal forward pass in American football history for SLU in 1906. Captained SLU's baseball and track teams. Practiced surgery at the Mayo Clinic (1908–1910) and served on the staff of Surgeon General Hugh S. Cumming (1920–1926). Twice elected mayor of St. Louis, Michigan (1931 and 1937).
 Richard Stika – Third Bishop of the Diocese of Knoxville.
John Stowe, O.F.M. Conv.  – Bishop of the Diocese of Lexington in Kentucky
 Sister Rose Thering O.P. (Ph.D. 1961) – Dominican nun whose campaign against anti-Semitism in Catholic textbooks is the subject of the Oscar-nominated 39-minute documentary film directed by Oren Jacoby, Sister Rose's Passion.
 Bobby Wilks – First African American Coast Guard aviator, the first African American to reach the rank of captain in the Coast Guard and the first African American to command a Coast Guard air station.
Edward Rice – Seventh Bishop of the Diocese of Springfield  – Cape Girardeau.

Notable faculty

Past
 Raymond J. Bishop  – Priest involved in notable exorcism that inspired The Exorcist (novel).
 Vernon Bourke (1931-1975) – philosopher and author, considered an authority on Thomistic moral philosophy; first hockey coach of the university.
 Edward Adelbert Doisy, (November 3, 1893 - October 23, 1986) – biochemist, awarded the Nobel Prize in Physiology or Medicine in 1943 with Henrik Dam for their discovery of vitamin K and its chemical structure.
 Timothy Michael Cardinal Dolan, served as an adjunct professor of theology.
 Robert J. Henle, S.J.  – professor of philosophy and leading figure in the revival of Thomistic philosophy. He was elected a member of the American Academy of Arts and Sciences. Prior to and following his appointment as president of Georgetown University (1969-1976), he served as a professor and lecturer in the College of Arts and Sciences, and Saint Louis University School of Law
 James B. Macelwane – pioneering seismologist
 Marshall McLuhan (1937-1944) – well known for coining the expressions "the medium is the message" and the "global village".
 Kurt Schuschnigg (1948-1967) – Chancellor of Austria from 1934 to 1938. An ally of Mussolini who continued the conservative, authoritarian and pro-Catholic state established by assassinated chancellor Engelbert Dollfuß (often referred to as “Austrofascism”), Schuschnigg is also known for advocating continued Austrian national sovereignty as opposed to annexation or Anschluss by the Third Reich and for suppression of political opposition within Austria, including the communists, social democrats and Nazis. He was pressured to resign by Hitler during his country's annexation by Germany and interned in Dachau concentration camp.
 Thomas Shippey – author and former faculty member of Oxford University, where he taught Old English. Widely considered one of the leading academic scholars of J. R. R. Tolkien.
 James Oliver Van de Velde  – taught mathematics and rhetoric.

Present
George W. Draper III – Chief Justice of the Missouri Supreme Court
 Clarence H. Miller – Emeritus Professor of English known for his contributions to the study of Renaissance literature, including his translations of St. Thomas More's Utopia and Erasmus's Praise of Folly.
 Thomas F. Madden – historian of Venice and the crusades; author of The New Concise History of the Crusades and Enrico Dandolo and the Rise of Venice
 Jerome Katz – Coleman Professor of Entrepreneurship; founder of the Billiken Angels Network.
Eric Schmitt – Attorney General of Missouri
 Eleonore Stump  – Robert J. Henle Professor of Philosophy; known for her work in Thomistic philosophy, study of the problem of evil, and contributions to the developing discipline of analytic theology.

School presidents

Saint Louis College
 Francois Niel (1818–1824)
 Edmund Saulnier (1825–1827)
 Charles Felix Van Quickenborne, S.J. (1828–1829) 
 Peter Verhaegen, S.J. (1829–1832)

Saint Louis University
 Peter Verhaegen, S.J. (1832–1836)
 John A. Elet, S.J. (1836–1840)
 James O. Van de Velde, S.J. (1840–1843)
 George A. Carrell, S.J. (1843–1847)
 John B. Druyts, S.J. (1847–1854)
 John S. Verdin, S.J. (1854–1859)
 Ferdinand Coosemans, S.J. (1859–1862)
 Thomas O’Neil, S.J. (1862–1868)
 Francis F. Stunteback, S.J. (1868–1871)
 Joseph G. Zealand, S.J. (1871–1874)
 Leopold Bushart, S.J. (1874–1877)
 Joseph E. Keller, S.J. (1877–1881)
 Rudolph J. Meyer, S.J. (1881–1885)
 Henry Moeller, S.J. (1885–1889)
 Edward J. Gleeson, S.J. (1889–1890)
 Joseph Grimmelsman, S.J. (1890–1898)
 James F. X. Hoeffer, S.J. (1898-1900)
 Williams Banks Rogers, S.J. (1900–1908)
 John Pierre Frieden, S.J. (1908–1911)
 Alexander J. Burrowes, S.J. (1911–1913)
 Bernard J. Otting, S.J. (1913–1920)
 William F. Robison, S.J. (1920–1924)
 Charles Cloud, S.J. (1924–1930)
 Robert S. Johnston, S.J. (1930–1936)
 Harry B. Crimmins, S.J. (1936–1942)
 Patrick J. Holloran, S.J. (1943–1948)
 Paul C. Reinert, S.J. (1949–1974)
 Daniel C. O’Connell, S.J. (1974–1978)
 Edward Drummond, S.J. (1978–1979)
 Thomas R. Fitzgerald, S.J. (1979–1987)
 Lawrence H. Biondi, S.J. (1987–2013)
 William R. Kauffman, J.D. (interim, 2013–2014)
 Fred P. Pestello, Ph.D. (2014–present)

References

External links
List of SLU presidents

Saint Louis University

Saint Louis